Gary Arthur Vincent Baxter (born 5 March 1952) is a New Zealand cricket umpire. He has stood in 38 ODI games since 2005.

Umpiring career
Baxter made his list A cricket debut in 1998 and first class cricket debut in the following year.

See also
 List of One Day International cricket umpires
 List of Twenty20 International cricket umpires

References

1952 births
Living people
New Zealand One Day International cricket umpires
New Zealand Twenty20 International cricket umpires